St. James is a census-designated place in St. James Parish, Louisiana, United States. It is part of the New Orleans Metropolitan Area . Its population was 828 as of the 2010 census.

Demographics

References

Census-designated places in St. James Parish, Louisiana
New Orleans metropolitan area